The following television stations operate on virtual channel 6 in Canada:

 CBMT-DT in Montreal, Quebec
 CBWT-DT in Winnipeg, Manitoba
 CHAU-DT-4 in Chandler, Quebec
 CHEK-DT in Victoria, British Columbia
 CHKM-DT in Kamloops, British Columbia
 CIII-DT in Paris, Ontario
 CIII-DT-6 in Ottawa, Ontario
 CIMT-DT-6 in Rivière-du-Loup, Quebec
 CJPM-DT in Saguenay, Quebec

06 virtual TV stations in Canada